Stray Sheep (stylized in all caps) is the fifth album by Kenshi Yonezu, released on August 5, 2020. The name of the album was inspired by the New Testament. The song "Kanden" has been used as the theme song of the comedy TV series MIU404. The album sold over 879,000 copies in its first week, debuting atop the Oricon Albums Chart. It was the top selling album of 2020 in Japan according to both Billboard Japan and Oricon. The latter calculated that the album had sold 1,970,930 copies in Japan by the end of 2020, summarizing CDs, vinyls, downloads, and streaming equivalents. 

According to the International Federation of the Phonographic Industry (IFPI), Stray Sheep was the world's third-best-selling album of 2020, with 2.54 million sales worldwide.

Release 
Stray Sheep was released digitally worldwide on August 5, 2020. The album was available on physical formats in South Korea and Taiwan on October 16, 2020.

Singles 
"Lemon" is the first single of the album and was released on February 27, 2018. It served as the theme song for the TBS television drama Unnatural. "Spirits of the Sea (Umi no Yuurei)" was chosen as the theme song of the animated film Children of the Sea. "Uma to Shika" is the theme song of TBS television drama No Side Manager. "Paprika" is the representative song for 2020 Summer Olympics.

Commercial performance 
The song "Kanden" was released on YouTube on July 10, 2020, and reached 10 million views in four days, breaking Yonezu's own record. The studio album has sold one million copies within 10 days. Besides, the album hit number one under the J-Pop category in over 30 countries in iTunes Chart and hit number one in 54 countries under the J-Pop Apple Music Albums Chart. And the topped 20 All Genres category in 22 Countries/Regions, 6 of which hit Number one.

Track listing

Charts

Weekly charts

Year-end charts

Certifications and sales

References

2020 albums
Kenshi Yonezu albums
SME Records albums